Gabriela Dancău is the Romanian Ambassador to Italy, Malta, and San Marino starting in 2022. Previously she served as her country's consul general in Lyon from 2011 and ambassador to Spain from 2016.

Dancău completed her secondary education at the Matei Basarab High School in Strehaia in 1996 and her undergraduate studies at the Bucharest Academy of Economic Studies in 2000.

References

1977 births
Living people
Romanian diplomats
Bucharest Academy of Economic Studies alumni
École nationale d'administration alumni
Ambassadors of Romania to Italy
Ambassadors of Romania to Malta
Ambassadors of Romania to San Marino
Ambassadors of Romania to Spain